The 2012–13 season was Parma Football Club's 22nd season in Serie A, and their fourth consecutive season in the top-flight, having finished in eighth position in the previous season. The team is also competing in the Coppa Italia and benefit from a bye to the Round of 16 after the strong league finish.

Pre-season
On 4 June 2012, the club announced its intention to go on a pre-retiro in Sardinia from 4 until 10 July. This was to be followed by a third consecutive season retiro in Levico Terme from 14 until 28 July, where they would again face Levico and Slavia Prague. Thirty-one players were initially selected to take part. From 31 July to 5 August would be spent in Prague, where two friendlies were organised.

Kick-off times are in CET or CEST.

Competitions

Serie A

Parma's first game of the season was a trip to Turin to face champions Juventus. Banned for his part in the 2011–12 Italian football scandal, Juventus boss Antonio Conte saw his side win 2–0 through second Stephan Lichtsteiner and Andrea Pirlo goals in the second half. Parma goalkeeper Antonio Mirante had saved a dubiously awarded penalty in the first half. There was some doubt whether or not Pirlo's effort crossed the line, but Parma coach Roberto Donadoni refused to comment.

League table

Results summary

Results by round

Matches

Coppa Italia

Statistics

Appearances and goals

|-
! colspan="10" style="background:#dcdcdc; text-align:center"| Goalkeepers

|-
! colspan="10" style="background:#dcdcdc; text-align:center"| Defenders

|-
! colspan="10" style="background:#dcdcdc; text-align:center"| Midfielders

|-
! colspan="10" style="background:#dcdcdc; text-align:center"| Forwards

|-
! colspan="10" style="background:#dcdcdc; text-align:center"| Players transferred out during the season

Goalscorers
This includes all competitive matches.  The list is sorted by shirt number when total goals are equal.
{| class="wikitable sortable" style="font-size: 95%; text-align: center;"
|-
!width=15|
!width=15|
!width=15|
!width=15|
!width=150|Name
!width=80|Serie A
!width=80|Coppa Italia
!width=80|Total
|-
|1
|11
|FW
|
|Amauri
|10
|0
|10
|-
|2
|9
|FW
|
|Ishak Belfodil
|8
|0
|8
|-
|3
|21
|FW
|
|Nicola Sansone
|6
|0
|6
|-
|4
|10
|MF
|
|Jaime Valdés
|4
|0
|4
|-
|5
|16
|MF
|
|Marco Parolo
|3
|0
|3
|-
|=
|87
|DF
|
|Aleandro Rosi
|3
|0
|3
|-
|7
|7
|FW
|
|Jonathan Biabiany
|2
|0
|2
|-
|8
|5
|DF
|
|Cristian Zaccardo
|1
|0
|1
|-
|=
|6
|DF
|
|Alessandro Lucarelli
|1
|0
|1
|-
|=
|8
|MF
|
|Daniele Galloppa
|1
|0
|1
|-
|=
|17
|FW
|
|Raffaele Palladino
|1
|0
|1
|-
|=
|18
|DF
|
|Massimo Gobbi
|1
|0
|1
|-
|=
|28
|DF
|
|Yohan Benalouane
|1
|0
|1
|-
|=
|29
|DF
|
|Gabriel Paletta
|1
|0
|1
|-
|=
|32
|MF
|
|Marco Marchionni
|1
|0
|1
|-
|=
|88
|FW
|
|Dorlan Pabón
|0
|1
|1

Transfers

The dates given below relate to the date on which registration for the 2012–13 season was deposited to Serie A. The summer transfer window runs from 1 July 2012 until 31 August 2012. Non-EU signings, which are limited to 2 for this season in Serie A and comprise the new registration of those who are not EU or EFTA nationals signed from non-Italian clubs, are marked in yellow.

On 21 June 2012, the first significant move of Parma's summer was announced: top scorer and Italian international Sebastian Giovinco re-joined Juventus, who already owned half of the player's registration, in a €11 million deal. Parma's share of Fabio Borini, previously co-owned but plying his trade with Roma, was bought out by the Rome club for €4.9 million on 23 June. On 28 June, the club announced the first of a duo forward replacements when Colombian striker Dorlan Pabón became a Parma player. Four days later, Brazilian-Italian forward Amauri rejoined the club on a two-year deal. He had been out of contract with former club Fiorentina and netted seven times in 11 appearances in a short spell on loan at Parma in 2011.

The club French defender Yohan Benalouane in late August on a year-long loan deal. This was followed by the loan signing of Venezuelan youngster Manuel Arteaga, who was at Zulia.

In January, Parma and Feyenoord agreed to a €3 million deal to make Graziano Pellè's move to the Dutch side permanent.

In

Out

Loan in

Loan out

References

Parma Calcio 1913 seasons
Parma